"Gold Lion" is the first single by American indie rock band Yeah Yeah Yeahs from their second album, Show Your Bones.  Distinct in the Yeah Yeah Yeahs' discography, it features acoustic guitar and a more slowed-down pace in contrast to earlier works like "Bang!" and "Date with the Night". It was released on March 20, 2006, and became the band's second major hit after 2004's "Maps".

"Gold Lion" was named after the two Gold Lion awards won by the Adidas commercial Hello Tomorrow at the 2005 Cannes Lions International Advertising Festival. Karen O had contributed vocals to ad's song composed by Sam "Squeak E. Clean" Spiegel, brother of Karen's then-boyfriend Spike Jonze who had directed the ad.

In popular culture

It has been noted by some music critics that "Gold Lion" sounds similar to "No New Tale To Tell" from 1980s alternative band Love and Rockets.

In 2010 the instrumentals of the song were used in a commercial for Apple Inc.'s iPad device.

In 2019 The Accidentals included a cover of the song on their album Live.

Track listing
"Gold Lion" – 3:09
"Let Me Know" (Demo) – 3:31
"Gold Lion" (Diplo's Optimo remix) – 4:04
"Gold Lion" (Nick Zinner remix) – 3:14

Music video
The music video directed by Patrick Daughters features the band playing in the Nevada desert at sunset and eventually night. At first we see Brian holding a large pile of drumsticks with more tied to his back. Then, Nick is seen walking dragging a number of acoustic guitars behind him.  Brian then sits at his drumkit with the pile of drumsticks. As he begins to play Brian's drumkit shoots out flames from his snare drum, which sets his drumstick alight and the ground around him as he continues to play. He then throws the stick on a pile of other drumsticks starting another fire. The rest of the band are seen performing, however they are all covered in sand and dust. At the pre-chorus Nick smashes his guitar on the ground, at the same time Karen wipes the dust off her face and takes off her sooty clothes to reveal her 'shiny' dress. Nick then plays the lead part on his electric guitar, the smashed guitar then sets on fire adding to the flames. The band continues playing in the same fashion with Nick smashing another acoustic guitar. The fire builds and the flames create a circle divided into 6ths surrounding the band. The video concludes with the band performing while surrounded by flames.

Charts

References

External links

2006 singles
Yeah Yeah Yeahs songs
2006 songs
Interscope Records singles
Songs written by Karen O
Songs written by Brian Chase
Songs written by Nick Zinner